"Sunshine" is a song by the American rock band Alice in Chains and the eighth track on their debut album, Facelift (1990). The song was written by guitarist and vocalist Jerry Cantrell as a tribute to his mother Gloria, who died in 1987.

Origin
Cantrell told Spin magazine in January 1991 that he wrote "Sunshine" about his mother's death. Cantrell told Spin:

Cantrell wrote the song in Los Angeles after Alice in Chains had moved from Seattle to L.A. after the death of their friend Andrew Wood, lead vocalist of Mother Love Bone, and were in the middle of recording their first album, Facelift. A demo version of the song can be found online.

Reception
Loudwire called the song "emotionally powerful", and that "Sunshine" "really left an emotional impact with many listeners as it came from a personal place for Cantrell." Classic Rock Review wrote; "A bright chorus of guitars make the verse section of 'Sunshine' unlike anything else on the album, although this track's chorus is a little more straightforward hard rock, with Cantrell singing some smooth backing vocals behind Staley's raspy throat."

Live performances
The song was performed live for the first time during Alice in Chains' concert at the club Natacha's in Bremerton, Washington. The last time the band performed this song with original lead vocalist Layne Staley was on February 1, 1991 at the Off Ramp Cafe in Seattle, Washington.

Alice in Chains performed the song for the first time in 24 years at the Global Event Center at WinStar World Resort in Thackerville, Oklahoma on August 1, 2015, with new vocalist William DuVall replacing Staley.

Personnel
Layne Staley – lead vocals
Jerry Cantrell – guitar, backing vocals
Mike Starr – bass
Sean Kinney – drums

References

External links

"Sunshine" on Setlist.fm

1990 songs
Alice in Chains songs
American hard rock songs
Funk metal songs
Commemoration songs
Songs written by Jerry Cantrell